Eternity's Child (previously known as Angel's Eternity) is a side-scrolling platform game based on a fairy tale created by Luc Bernard. It was released by Luc Bernard and Silver Sphere Studios on Steam July 31, 2008. A Wii version was planned, but eventually cancelled.

Gameplay
The gameplay involves the player controlling two characters simultaneously. In the Wii version, one will be controlled with the analogue stick of the Nunchuk and the other with the pointer function of the Wii Remote. Eternity's Childs level editor can be used with the game's editable source material to remake or edit the entire game.

Development
Eternity's Child was initially developed for Xbox Live Arcade, and was one of the first games to be made with the XNA toolset. On September 9, 2007, it was revealed that it was changed to a retail Nintendo DS game as well as a downloadable WiiWare game. However, Bernard later confirmed that the Nintendo DS version has been canceled, while also announcing that the game will come to PCs via Steam. Bernard is also considering releasing the game on the PlayStation 3 through the PlayStation Store, though he insists the WiiWare version will still be the best iteration of the game because of the platform specific controls.

Because of the move to the Wii, the gameplay style of the XNA version has been changed in favor of one that takes advantage of the Wii Remote. Alten8 are porting the original code, and adapting the game to Nintendo's  standards for the Wii version, and hope that previous errors can be resolved. However, Bernard stated on his blog in February 2009 that he was "not happy at all that it's still not out on WiiWare" and that Alten8 were "taking the whole team for idiots."

The Wii version, while it hasn't been officially cancelled, is considered vaporware, as no further news have been released as of today.

Reception
Gametunnel gave Eternity's Child a score of 6.3/10. Russ Carroll said "it certainly isn't the disaster it is made out to be", but "it feels like it is brushing up against greatness".

Eternity's Child was panned by gaming site Destructoid for "flawed design", "horrible animation" and "broken controls". In reviewing the game, which he gave a 1/10, Anthony Burch went so far as to say that it was "the worst game I've played in several years." Bernard responded to the review, calling it "highly unprofessional", and defended the title by stating that Destructoid did not play the patched version. Bernard has drawn further criticism after he decided to remove the Destructoid robot from the game in response to the review.

The game was also panned by Mike Fahey of Kotaku for its "story, or lack thereof", two-character mechanic, poor AI, and somewhat chaotic level design. However, he also noted that its visual style and music are appealing, and that the included level editor was also an extra bonus, and stated that the game "does have a lot to offer for $5". He concluded that the game is "still very much a work in progress".

The game received a 3/5 by de-frag.com. They mention that "Eternity's Child shows a lot of promise, but numerous small mistakes and some frustrating level design spoils what is otherwise an enjoyable game." The game was reviewed with the 1.02 patch and they mention that Eternity's Child is a difficult game to judge. But overall "If you enjoy 2D platformers and are willing to tolerate some extremely difficult levels and slightly loose controls, it's worth picking up."

Eternity's Childs soundtrack was nominated on the GANG Awards for "Best Audio Other".

Sequel
A sequel titled Eternity's Child 2: Retro Child was announced in 2008.
It plans to be a 16-bit remake of an old canceled GBA game. No further news has been released as of today.

Eternity's Child: The Lost Chapter
A cancelled mobile version of Eternity's Child, Eternity's Child: The Lost Chapter, was released for free. The game contains five stages and three difficulty levels. It is no longer available for download as of today.

References

External links
Luc Bernard's blog
Developer's blog
EC: The Lost Chapter

2008 video games
Cancelled Nintendo DS games
Platform games
Video games developed in the United Kingdom
WiiWare games
Windows games
Wii games
Multiplayer and single-player video games